Allium melliferum is a species of plant in the amaryllis family and is native to Mexico.

References 

melliferum
Flora of Mexico